John Patitucci is the debut solo album of jazz bassist John Patitucci. The album reached No. 1 on the Billboard magazine Top Jazz Albums in 1987.

Track listing
All tracks composed by John Patitucci except where noted.
 "Growing" – 4:38
 "Wind Sprint" – 6:10
 "Searching, Finding" – 5:09
 "Baja Bajo" (Chick Corea, John Patitucci) – 5:49
 "Change of Season" – 3:57
 "Our Family" – 3:05
 "Peace and Quiet Time" – 5:02
 "Crestline" – 5:17
 "Zaragoza" (Chick Corea) – 4:00
 "Then & Now" – 5:44
 "Killeen" – 5:21
 "The View" – 5:37

Personnel
 John Patitucci – bass
 Michael Brecker – saxophone
 Chick Corea – piano
 John Beasley – synthesizer
 Dave Whitham  – synthesizer
 Dave Weckl – drums
 Vinnie Colaiuta – drums
 Peter Erskine – drums

References

External links
 

1987 debut albums
John Patitucci albums
GRP Records albums